Panther Creek State Park is a state park in Morristown, Tennessee, United States. It is located prominently on the shore of Cherokee Lake, an impoundment of the Holston River. The western terminus of Tennessee State Route 342 is located inside the park. The route connects the park to U.S. Route 11E (also known as Andrew Johnson Highway).

Amenities

Panther Creek State Park offers access to an on-site playground and a variety of recreational activities. These activities include paddling (kayaking, canoeing, and paddleboarding), disc golf, hiking, boating, biking, fishing, birding, horseback riding, and access to the pool and tennis courts.

Hiking
Each trail is ranked as easy, moderate, or difficult.

Camping
Panther Creek has 50 campsites spread all over the park. All campsites have access to water, electricity, and have picnic tables and fire rings. Eight of the campsites have access to sewer.

There are two bathhouses with hot showers and restrooms, a year-round laundromat, a dump station, and trading post.

References

External links

Map of Panther Creek State Park

State parks of Tennessee
Protected areas of Hamblen County, Tennessee
Morristown, Tennessee
Tourist attractions in Hamblen County, Tennessee
Hamblen County, Tennessee